Gerard Geron Augustus Williams (born 4 June 1988) is a Saint Kitts and Nevis international footballer who plays as a defender for I-League club TRAU and the Saint Kitts and Nevis national team.

Club career
Williams began his youth football career at Old Road F.C., that competes in the Antigua and Barbuda Premier Division. Later he joined Sunderland A.F.C. U23 and played there until 1 July 2009.

W Connection
In 2007, he signed for TT Pro League heavyweights W Connection from local Saint Kitts and Nevis side Old Road. He appeared in 19 CONCACAF Champions League matches with the Trinidadian side. He won some domestic and international trophies like TT Pro League, Trinidad and Tobago Charity Shield and Caribbean Club Championship with the club from 2009 to 2018.

TRAU (India)
In 2019, Williams signed for the Indian I-League side TRAU F.C. and represented the Manipuri outfit in 13 league matches. He scored his first goal for the club in a 2–1 win match against Churchill Brothers SC in 2020.

On 25 December 2021, rejoined TRAU ahead of the team's 2021–22 I-League season. In 2022, he appeared with TRAU against NEROCA in "Imphal Derby" in Group-C opener during the 131st edition of Durand Cup, where they were defeated by 3–1.

They later began their league journey of 2022–23 season on 15 November in their 1–1 draw against Aizawl.

International career
He made his international debut for the Saint Kitts and Nevis national team against Barbados on 20 October in 2006.

He scored his first international goal in 2008 against Belize in a 2010 FIFA World Cup Qualification match.

Career statistics

International

International goals
Scores and results list Saint Kitts and Nevis's goal tally first

Honours
List of tournaments, he won with his club W Connection.

W Connection
TT Pro League: 2018, 2011–12, 2013–14; runner-up: 2014–15, 2016–17, 2017
Trinidad and Tobago Charity Shield: 2012, 2015, 2018
Caribbean Club Championship: 2006, 2009; runner-up: 2012, 2015, 2016

See also
 Saint Kitts and Nevis international footballers

References

External links

 Gerard Williams footballer profile at fmdataba.com
 SKN footballer Gerard Williams at fotmob.com

1988 births
Living people
Saint Kitts and Nevis footballers
Saint Kitts and Nevis international footballers
Association football midfielders
Expatriate footballers in Trinidad and Tobago
TT Pro League players
TRAU FC players
Saint Kitts and Nevis under-20 international footballers
Saint Kitts and Nevis expatriate footballers
Saint Kitts and Nevis expatriate sportspeople in Trinidad and Tobago